Tore Falch Nilsen (27 March 1948 – 8 June 2008) was a Norwegian ice hockey player. He was born in Oslo and played for the club Hasle-Løren IL. He played for the Norwegian national ice hockey team at the 1980 Winter Olympics.

References

External links

1948 births
2008 deaths
Ice hockey people from Oslo
Norwegian ice hockey players
Olympic ice hockey players of Norway
Ice hockey players at the 1980 Winter Olympics